This is a list of cricketers who have played cricket for the Vidarbha Cricket Association.

A

 Anilkumar Abhayankar (1939–2016)
 R. N. Abhyankar
 Imran Ali
 Rajinder Amarnath (born 1956)
 Chandrashekhar Atram (born 1983)

B

 Hemang Badani (born 1976)
 Sairaj Bahutule (born 1973)
 Swapnil Bandiwar (born 1988)

C

 Abhishek Chaurasia (born 1991)
 Rahul Chikhalkar (born 1983)
 Aniruddha Chore

D

 Madhav Dalvi (1925–2012)
 Shiv Sunder Das (born 1977)
 Anil Deshpande (born 1952)
 Ramesh Dewan (born 1938)
 Sudhir Dhagamwar (1951–2010)

F

 Faiz Fazal (born 1985)

G

 Pritam Gandhe (born 1971)
 Ulhas Gandhe (born 1974)
 Rajneesh Gurbani (born 1993)

I

 Sadashiv Iyer (born 1972)

J

 Wasim Jaffer (born 1978)
 Ravi Jangid (born 1987)
 Amol Jichkar
 Amol Jungade (born 1989)

K

 Viraj Kadbe (born 1989)
 Shubham Kapse (born 1994)
 Akshay Karnewar (born 1992)
 Gajanan Kathaley (1946–2014)
 Kamraj Kesari (1922–1985)
 Kushal Kakad (born 1995)
Akshay Kolhar (born 1988)
 Sulakshan Kulkarni (born 1967)

M

 Dinesh Mirkar

N

 Alind Naidu (born 1983)
 Vivek Naidu (born 1979)
 Siddesh Neral (born 1994)

O

 Arun Ogiral (1942–2004)

P
Prasad Shetty 1981_89

 Madan Pande (1943–2014)
 Rashmi Parida (born 1977)
 Urvesh Patel (born 1988)
 Amit Paunikar (born 1988)

Pranjal Sangole (born 1989)

R

 Syed Rahim (1929–2014)
 Murthy Rajan (born 1944)
 Lalchand Rajput (born 1961)
 Sanjay Ramaswamy (born 1995)
 Rushabh Rathod (born 1994)
 Sumit Ruikar (born 1990)

S

 Piyush Sadhu (1977–2014)
 Wasuderao Sane (1914–1991)
 Aditya Sarwate (born 1989)
 Chandu Sarwate (1920–2003)
 Madhukar Sathe (born 1934)
 Aditya Shanware (born 1991)
 Jitesh Sharma (born 1993)
 Azhar Sheikh (born 1985)
 Shalabh Shrivastava (born 1986)
 Sandeep Singh (born 1981)

T

 Vijay Telang (1952–2013)
 Sharad Thakre (1968–2014)
 Ravikumar Thakur (born 1984)
 Yash Thakur (born 1999)
 Vishweshwar Thool (1946–2014)

U

 Amol Ubarhande (born 1988)
 Ashok Upadhyay (born 1953)

V

 Prashant Vaidya (born 1967)
 R. Venkataraman

W

 Akshay Wadkar (born 1994)
 Shrikant Wagh (born 1988)
 Akshay Wakhare (born 1985)
 Apoorv Wankhade (born 1992)
 Siddhesh Wath (born 1997)
*[Hemant Wasu (Born October 1960)

Y

 Baburao Yadav (born 1982)
 Lalit Yadav (born 1995)
 Umesh Yadav (born 1987)

References

Vidarbha cricketers

cricketers